Salman Faruk Khan (born 26 December 1998) is an Indian cricketer. He made his first-class debut for Rajasthan in the 2016–17 Ranji Trophy on 5 November 2016, scoring 110 runs.

References

External links
 

1998 births
Living people
Indian cricketers
Rajasthan cricketers
People from Jhalawar district